Apalona is an unincorporated community in Oil Township, Perry County, in the U.S. state of Indiana.

History
The first post office at Apalona was called Lashers. The post office opened in 1858, was renamed Apalona in 1864, and closed in 1955.

Geography

References

Unincorporated communities in Perry County, Indiana
Unincorporated communities in Indiana